The 1982 Edgbaston Cup was a women's tennis tournament played on outdoor grass courts that was part of the 1982 WTA Tour. It was the inaugural edition of the event. It took place at the Edgbaston Priory Club in Birmingham, United Kingdom, from 7 to 13 June 1982.

Entrants

Seeds

Other entrants
The following players received entry from the qualifying draw:
  Renee Blount
  Lele Forood
  Trey Lewis
  Nancy Neviaser
  Elizabeth Sayers
  Kim Steinmetz
  Amanda Tobin
  Pam Whytcross

Finals

Singles

 Billie Jean King defeated  Rosalyn Fairbank 6–2, 6–1
 It was King's first title of the year and the 127th of her career.

Doubles
 Jo Durie /  Anne Hobbs defeated  Rosie Casals /  Wendy Turnbull 6–3, 6–2
 It was Durie's first doubles title of the year and of her career. It was also Hobbs' first doubles title of the year and of her career.

External links
 1982 Edgbaston Cup Draws
 ITF Tournament Page

Edgbaston Cup
Birmingham Classic (tennis)
Edgbaston Cup
Edgbaston Cup